Cook Island may refer to:

 Cook Island of Kiritimati, Kiribati 
 Cook Island (New South Wales), an island
Cook Island Aquatic Reserve, a marine protected area in New South Wales
Cook Island Nature Reserve, a protected area in New South Wales
Cook Island, South Sandwich Islands, central island in Southern Thule
 "Cook Island" is the adjectival demonym for people and things from the Cook Islands

See also
 Cook Islands, self-governing democracy in the Pacific in free association with New Zealand
 Cook (disambiguation)